Allouis is a commune in the Cher department of the Centre-Val de Loire region of France.

Geography

Population

Places of interest
 The church of St. Germain, dating from the eleventh century.
 A megalith, the “Pierre de Lu”.
 Traces of a fifteenth-century fortified house.
 The chapel of St.Jean.
 The château les Fontaines.
 The radio mast.

Transmission facility

Since 1939, the town of Allouis has housed the central transmitter station for long and short wave broadcasts of French national radio France Inter. In 1944, retreating German troops destroyed its four-latticed mast antenna system which was used in conjunction with the existing 900 kilowatt(kW) transmitter.

On 19 October 1952 a new long wave transmitter with an output of 250 kW was put into service at Allouis. It featured three special prism aerials, which were suspended between steel framework mastsat a height of 308 meters. Transmitting power was increased to 600 kW in 1957, to 1,000 kW in 1974 and to 2,000 kW in 1981. The system attains its full transmitting potential during daylight hours. The antenna system underwent extensive conversion in 1974. The prism aerials were removed and antenna masts were increased to a height of 350 meters. In addition, a second 350-meter high mast was built to provide better coverage within France.
Since 1977, the Allouis transmitter also transmits standard time signals for AMDS. Wave frequencies are generated on the basis of an atomic clock located in the transmitter station and serves for calibration frequency purposes.

The radio channel France Inter discontinued the longwave transmitting (162 kHz) end of 2016.

See also
Communes of the Cher department

References

External links

Installation of ALLISS modules at the TDF SW relay station

Communes of Cher (department)